Sonepur College is located in Sonepur town, district headquarters of Subarnapur district, Odisha, India.

History

This college was started in 1964 with pre-university arts class under Utkal University. On 01.05.2020 this institute came under the jurisdiction of Rajendra Narayan University. However the students for the academic year 2022 still graduate under Sambalpur University.  
Formally classes were started in the old Judge Court Building of Sonepur state. Later it was shifted in to the majestic mansion of ‘MITRODAYA BHAWAN', the guest house of the royal family located on the bank of the river Mahanadi. This building was donated by the Trust Fund, Sonepur in 1966.

The institution started (Bachelor of Arts) B.A. classes in 1966, I.Sc (Intermediate in Science) in 1971 and (Bachelor of Science) B.Sc. classes in 1975. After getting its full-fledged status in all branches of Arts, Science, and Commerce with all the essential subjects it got Honours affiliation in various Arts (Oriya, History, Political Science, Economics, English, Education, Sanskrit, Mathematics, Philosophy), and Science (Physics, Chemistry, mathematics, Botany and Zoology) subjects.

Departments
Faculty of Arts

 DEPARTMENT OF ENGLISH
 DEPARTMENT OF ECONOMICS
 DEPARTMENT OF ORIYA
 DEPARTMENT OF POLITICAL SCIENCE
 DEPARTMENT OF HISTORY
 DEPARTMENT OF SANSKRIT
 DEPARTMENT OF PHILOSOPHY
 DEPARTMENT OF EDUCATION
 DEPARTMENT OF HINDI

Faculty of Science

 DEPARTMENT OF PHYSICS
 DEPARTMENT OF CHEMISTRY
 DEPARTMENT OF MATHEMATICS
 DEPARTMENT OF BOTANY
 DEPARTMENT OF ZOOLOGY

Faculty of Commerce

 DEPARTMENT OF COMMERCE

Hostels and student facilities
There are two hostels for students. The Principal is the final authority in all matters relating to the hostel. Other student facilities are:

 AUDIO VISUAL  CLUB
National Cadet Crops (NCC)

ASSOCIATION and SOCIETIES

 Dramatic Association
 The Day Scholars' Association
 The English Association
 Athletic Association
 Music society
 Science Society

References

External links
 History of Sonepur College 
 Sonepur College web site
 Sonepur College profile in Indiastudychannel 

Universities and colleges in Odisha
Education in Subarnapur district
1964 establishments in Orissa
Educational institutions established in 1964